The 1934 Texas Tech Matadors football team represented Texas Technological College—now known as Texas Tech University—as a member of the Border Conference during the 1934 college football season. In their fifth season under head coach Pete Cawthon, the Matadors compiled a 7–2–1 record (1–0 against conference opponents) and outscored opponents by a combined total of 192 to 84. The team played its home games at Tech Field.

Schedule

References

Texas Tech
Texas Tech Red Raiders football seasons
Texas Tech Matadors football